Adoni Municipality is the local self-government in Adoni, a city in the Indian state of Andhra Pradesh. It is classified as a special grade municipality.

Administration 
The municipality was formed in the year 1865. The Elected Wing of the municipality consists of a municipal council, which has elected members and is headed by a Chairman. Whereas, the  Executive Wing is headed by a municipal commissioner. The present municipal commissioner of the city is B.Sreekanth and the chairperson is Kuruba Sarojamma.

The municipality has approximately, 32,856–33,071 households.

Awards and achievements 
The city is one among the 31 cities in the state to be a part of water supply and sewerage services mission known as Atal Mission for Rejuvenation and Urban Transformation (AMRUT). In 2015, as per the Swachh Bharat Abhiyan of the Ministry of Urban Development, Adoni Municipality was ranked 148th in the country.

See also 
 List of municipalities in Andhra Pradesh

References 

1865 establishments in India
Government agencies established in 1865
Urban local bodies in Andhra Pradesh